Virgin Group Ltd. is a British multinational venture capital conglomerate founded by Richard Branson and Nik Powell in February 1970.

Virgin Group's date of incorporation is listed as 1989 by the Companies House, who class it as a holding company; however Virgin's business and trading activities date back to the 1970s. The net worth of Virgin Group was estimated at £5–5.5 billion as of November 2014.

History
The name "Virgin" arose in 1970 when Richard Branson and Nik Powell formed a record shop, first as mail order and in 1971 with a physical store. They considered themselves virgins in business. Branson has described the "V" in the logo as an expressive tick, representing the Virgin seal of approval.

The original logo from 1973 was a completely different design intended to be used for the record company that was founded by Richard Branson and Nik Powell. The logo was designed by British science-fiction artist and designer Roger Dean. According to Richard Branson in interviews and on the Virgin website, the more recent signature logo, introduced in 1978, was based on one that designer Ray Kyte scribbled on a napkin after a design meeting.

Corporate affairs
Virgin Group has its headquarters at The Battleship Building in the Paddington district of the City of Westminster. Previously it was in The School House, Brook Green, in the London Borough of Hammersmith and Fulham.

The Virgin Group of companies have a complex structure that contains elements of a generic conglomerate and a keiretsu, and sometimes it simply licences its brand. Examples of licensing are Virgin Records and Virgin Media, which are owned by Universal Music Group and Liberty Global respectively.

In mid-May 2013, the Virgin Group expressed its intention to seek out opportunities in Australia's healthcare industry to consolidate on the Group's Australian fitness centres. The Group also runs over 100 National Health Service (NHS) services in the United Kingdom and the healthcare division of medical services group Assura after entering the British healthcare industry in 2011.

Virgin Group announced the establishment of Virgin Voyages on 4 December 2014 with financial backing from Bain Capital. The cruise line would be led by CEO Tom McAlpin, would have two new large ships built and be based in the Miami/Fort Lauderdale area.

Virgin StartUp
Virgin StartUp is the Virgin Group's non-profit company, helping entrepreneurs across the UK to start, fund and scale their business. In 2013, Sir Richard visited Boxpark in Shoreditch, London, to launch the new organisation, revealing that he wanted to support anyone that had the same dreams and ambitions that he did as a young boy: “It was £300 from my mum that sparked the Virgin adventure 40 years ago. Today, young people need that same help and I believe Virgin StartUp will provide it – with access to early capital, strong mentorship, advice and promotion.”

The organisation became a delivery partner for the UK Government's Start Up Loans Company, providing loan finance of between £500 and £25,000, advice, and mentoring to thousands of start-ups across the country. In 2016, it was awarded European Regional Development Funding and subsequently launched Ready, Steady, Grow with Virgin StartUp, a programme of support aimed at start-ups that were ready to grow. A year later, it launched the UK's first equity-based crowdfunding accelerator programme, Crowdboost.

By 2018, the organisation had supported over 11,000 UK-based entrepreneurs, with over £35m in pre-seed funding.

Foodpreneur
In 2014, Branson and Virgin StartUp launched the "Foodpreneur" food and drink focused start-up competition. Winners received mentorship from Branson, legal support, and brand counseling. The 2014 winners included Proper Beans, Killer Tomato, Sweetpea Pantry, and Sweet Virtues.

In 2015, winners were given the opportunity to pitch Target Corporation buyers in the US. The 2015 winners included Pip & Nut, Double Dutch Drinks, Harry Bromptons, Cauli Rice, and Mallow and Marsh.

Only one start-up was announced winner of the 2017 Foodpreneur prize, The Snaffling Pig Co., who won a six-week rental space at Intu Lakeside, the retail center with the highest foot traffic in the U.K.

Senior leadership 

 Chairman: Peter Norris (since 2009)
 Chief Executive: Josh Bayliss (since 2014)

List of former chairmen 

 Sir Richard Branson (1970–2009)

List of former chief executives 

 Sir Richard Branson (1970–2005)
 Stephen Murphy (2005–2011)
 David Baxby and Josh Bayliss (2011–2014)

Subsidiaries and investments

Formerly owned ventures
 Absolute Radio: formerly Virgin Radio UK, rebranded in 2008
 Air Nigeria: Nigerian national airline launched as Virgin Nigeria, shares sold in 2010
 Connect Airways (Flybe): 30% stake held through Virgin Atlantic. Entered administration in March 2020.
 Virgin Airship and Balloon Company: Operating hot air balloons and airships for advertisers
 Liquid Comics: comic book producer formerly known as Virgin Comics—sold to management in 2008
 Vie at Home: cosmetics retailer formerly known as Virgin Vie, sold to management in 2009
 Virgin America: North American airline, sold to Alaska Air Group on 14 Dec 2016
 Virgin Brides: retailer specialising in bridal wear
 Virgin Care sold to Twenty20 Capital and rebranded as HCRG Care Group on 1 December 2021
 Virgin Cars: online car retailer, ceased trading in 2005
 Virgin Charter: online marketplace of private aircraft seat bookings
 Virgin Cinemas: sold to UGC in 1999
 Virgin Digital Help: technical support
 Virgin Drinks: drink manufacturer
 Virgin Cola: carbonated cola soft drink
 Virgin Vodka: alcoholic beverage
 v-Mix: spirit mixers
 Virgin Electronics: electronics retailer
 Virgin Energy: joint venture energy provider
 Virgin Express: airline based in Brussels, merged with SN Brussels Airlines in 2006 to form Brussels Airlines
 V Festival: British music festival sponsored by the Virgin Group
 V Festival (Australia): an Australian version of the V Festival
 Virgin Festival: a North American version of the V Festival
 Virgin Films: film production company
 Virgin Games: sold to Gamesys in 2013
 Virgin Green Fund: shut down in 2014
 Virgin Health Bank: sold to Qatar Foundation
 Virgin Interactive: Game Developer and publisher, bought by various companies, and renamed Avalon Interactive in 2003
 Virgin Limousines: a former limousine service that operated mostly in the US and Canada. It operated for 14 years, until November 2010.
 Virgin Media (including Virgin Mobile UK): UK Cable TV, broadband internet and Fixed and Mobile telephony provider—bought by Liberty Global
 Virgin Mobile Australia: mobile phone service provider in Australia—shares sold to Optus in 2006
 Virgin Mobile France: mobile phone service provider in France—shares sold to Numericable-SFR in 2014
 Virgin Mobile India: mobile phone service provider in India—shares sold to Tata Teleservices in 2015
 Virgin Mobile USA: mobile phone service provider in the USA—shares sold to Sprint Corporation in 2009, ceased operations in 2020. 
 Virgin Money Australia: sold to Bank of Queensland
 Virgin Money US: sold in 2010
Virgin Nigeria: national flag carrier of Nigeria. ceased operations in 2012
 Virgin One account: shareholding sold to co-owner (RBS) in 2003
 Virgin Sun Airlines: scheduled and charter airline, closed in 2001
 Virgin Play: Spanish game distributor and publisher, filed for liquidation and closed in 2009
 Virgin Plus: (formerly Virgin Mobile Canada) mobile phone service provider in Canada—shares sold to joint venture partner Bell Mobility in 2009
 Virgin Snow, 1986 joint venture with Bladon Lines Ski Vacations
 Virgin Trains ExpressCoach: former operator of inter-city bus & coach services (51%)
 Virgin CrossCountry: former operator of the Cross Country railway franchise in the United Kingdom, superseded by Arriva CrossCountry in 2007 (51%)
 Virgin EMI Records: soundtrack label—owned by Universal Music Group
 Virgin Records: American music soundtrack label
 Virgin Racing: Formula One motor racing team
 Virginware: clothing retailer
 Virgin Wines: online wine market, sold to Direct Wines in 2005
Virgin Trains West Coast: train operating company on the West Coast Main Line. Renewed franchise bid unsuccessful, superseded by Avanti West Coast in December 2019 (51%)
Virgin Trains East Coast: train operating company, supersed by London North Eastern Railway in June 2018 (10%)
Virgin Trains USA: train operating company between Miami and West Palm Beach, Florida. Branding deal launched in late 2018, ended in 2020.
Virgin Video (aka Virgin Vision): home video distributor, sold to Management Company Entertainment Group in 1989.

Controversies
The parent company, Virgin Group Holdings Ltd, is registered in the British Virgin Islands. Richard Branson and his family hold a £2.7 billion stake in this offshore, tax-free, tax haven company.

The group's health business received significant media coverage over its legal battle with NHS groups. It sued clinical commissioning groups (CCGs) in Surrey after it lost out on an £82 million contract to provide children's health services across the country. The NHS bodies settled out of court with a £328,000 payout to Virgin Care, resulting in some controversy. More than 100,000 people backed a petition calling on the company to stop "dragging the NHS through the courts".

In 2019, it was discovered that cell phones being sold by Virgin subsidiary company Assurance Wireless came with unremovable Chinese malware preinstalled.

References

External links
 

 
Airline holding companies
British brands
British companies established in 1970
Companies based in London
Conglomerate companies of the United Kingdom
Holding companies established in 1970
Holding companies of the United Kingdom